State Highway 9 (SH-9) in Tamil Nadu, India connects Cuddalore with Chittoor. Total length of SH-9 is 212 km.

SH-9 Route: Cuddalore - Nellikuppam - Panruti - Thiruvamur - Madapattu - Tirukkoyilur - Thiruvannamalai - Polur - Vellore city - Chittoor

Way
Many cities in four districts in Tamil Nadu on the road connecting . In each district, on the road, the main areas are listed below.
Cuddalore: Nellikkuppam, Melpattampakkam, Panruti, Thiruvamur.
Villupuram: Madappattu, Tirukkoyilur.
Thiruvannamalai: Tiruvannamalai, Polur, Kannamangalam.
Vellore: Vellore city.

Highway meetings

State Highway 9, National Highway 45C pannurutti to the point, National Highway 45 matappattu to the point, National Highway 66 to the point of Tiruvannamalai, National Highway 46  tend to cut across velurilum.

Many state highways cut across this Highway. Certain roads which are listed below.

 State Highway 68 at Panruti
 State Highway 69 at Periya Sevalai
 State Highway 68 at Tirukkoyilur
 State Highway 7, at Tirukkoyilur
 State Highway 135 at Tiruvannamalai
 State Highway 115 at Polur
 State Highway 59 at Katpadi, vellore city

External links
 Cuddalore-Chittoor State Highway Map

State highways in Tamil Nadu